Hales Island is part of the Great Barrier Reef Marine Park 5 km east of Cape Melville, Queensland. It is around 1 hectares or 0.01 square km in size.

There is a significant population of Torresian imperial pigeons in the area.

References

Islands on the Great Barrier Reef
Islands of Far North Queensland
Places in the Great Barrier Reef Marine Park